William McMurray (ca. 1813 – May 30, 1868) was an American lawyer and politician from New York.

Life
In 1832, McMurray was among the first students of New York University. He was a member of the New York State Assembly (New York Co.) in 1841, 1842 and 1843. He was a member of the New York State Senate (2nd D.) in 1852 and 1853. He was a member of the Board of Commissioners of the Metropolitan Police of New York City from 1864 to 1866.

On the morning of May 31, 1868, he was found dead in his bed, at his residence on Fifth Avenue. Apparently, he had died of apoplexy in his sleep.

External links 
The New York Civil List compiled by Franklin Benjamin Hough (pages 137, 146 and 361; Weed, Parsons and Co., 1858)
New York University and the City by Thomas J. Frusciano & Marilyn H. Pettit (1997; pg. 16)
Manual of the Corporation of the City of New-York (1864; pg. 113)
Manual of the Corporation of the City of New-York (1865; pg. 90)
Sudden Death of Hon. William McMurray in NYT on June 1, 1868

1810s births
1868 deaths
Democratic Party members of the New York State Assembly
Democratic Party New York (state) state senators
New York University alumni
New York City Police Commissioners
19th-century American politicians